Wilcox County is the name of two counties in the United States:

 Wilcox County, Alabama
 Wilcox County, Georgia